Josep Maria Colomer Calsina is a political scientist and economist. His research focuses on the strategies for the design, establishment, and change of political institutions. Topics include the processes of democratization, the origins of parliamentary and separation of powers regimes, the invention of electoral systems and voting rules, the development of nations and empires such as the United States and the European Union, and the increasing role of global institutions.

Josep Colomer is currently an Associate Research Professor at the School of Foreign Service of Georgetown University and at the Institute of Political and Social Sciences of the Autonomous University of Barcelona. He is a member by election of the Academia Europaea, was a founding member of the Spanish Political Science Association (AECPA), and has been awarded life membership to the American Political Science Association and the Mexican Association of Political Sciences.

Selected publications

References

External links 
 

20th-century Spanish male writers
Walsh School of Foreign Service alumni
Members of Academia Europaea
21st-century Spanish male writers
20th-century  Spanish economists
21st-century  Spanish economists
1949 births
Living people
Spanish political scientists
Spanish male non-fiction writers